Below is an incomplete list of godchildren of members of the Danish Royal Family:

Juliane Marie of Brunswick-Wolfenbüttel
 Caroline Amalie of Augustenburg, later Queen of Denmark, (1796–1881)

Caroline Amalie of Augustenburg
 Princess (Marie Sophie Frederikke) Dagmar of Denmark, later Empress Maria Feodorovna of Russia, (1847–1928)
 Princess Thyra Amalie Caroline Charlotte Anna of Denmark (1853–1933)
 Prince Valdemar of Denmark (1858–1939)
 Princess Victoria Alexandra Olga Mary of the United Kingdom (1868–1935)
 Prince George of Greece and Denmark (1869–1957)
 Prince Christian Carl Frederik Albert Alexander Vilhelm of Denmark, later King Christian X, (1870–1947)
 Prince Christian Frederik Carl Georg Valdemar Axel of Denmark, later King Haakon VII of Norway, (1872–1957)
 Princess Louise Caroline Josephine Sophie Thyra Olga of Denmark (1875–1906)
 Princess Ingeborg Charlotte Caroline Frederikke of Denmark, later Duchess of Västergötland, (1878–1958)
 Princess Thyra Louise Caroline Amalie Augusta Elisabeth of Denmark (1880–1945)

King Christian IX
 Prince Albert Victor Christian Edward of the United Kingdom, later Duke of Clarence and Avondale, (1864–1892)
 Prince Christian Carl Frederik Albert Alexander Vilhelm of Denmark, later King Christian X, (1870–1947)
 Prince Nicholas of Greece and Denmark (1872–1938)
 Prince Christian Frederik Carl Georg Valdemar Axel of Denmark, later King Haakon VII of Norway, (1872–1957)
 Princess Louise Caroline Josephine Sophie Thyra Olga of Denmark (1875–1906)
 Princess Ingeborg Charlotte Caroline Frederikke of Denmark, later Duchess of Västergötland, (1878–1958)
 Princess Olga of Greece and Denmark (1880–1880)
 Princess Thyra Louise Caroline Amalie Augusta Elisabeth of Denmark (1880–1945)
 Prince Christian Friedrich Wilhelm Georg Peter Waldemar of Hanover (1885–1901)
 Prince Aage Christian Alexander Robert of Denmark (1887–1940)
 Prince Ernst August Christian Georg of Hanover (1887–1953)
 Prince Christopher of Greece and Denmark (1888–1940)
 Prince Axel Christian Georg of Denmark (1888–1964)
 Prince Erik Gustav Ludvig Albert of Sweden and Norway (1889–1918)
 Prince Viggo Christian Adolf Georg of Denmark (1893–1970)
 Prince Edward Albert Christian George Andrew Patrick David of York, later King Edward VIII of the United Kingdom, (1894–1972)
 Grand Duchess Olga Nikolaevna of Russia (1895–1918)
 Grand Duchess Tatiana Nikolaevna of Russia (1897–1918)
 Prince (Christian) Frederik Franz Michael Carl Valdemar Georg of Denmark, later King Frederik IX, (1899–1972)
 Tsarevich Alexei of Russia (1904–1918)

Louise of Hesse-Kassel
 Prince George Frederick Ernest Albert of Wales, later King George V of the United Kingdom, (1865–1936)
 Princess Louise Victoria Alexandra Dagmar of Wales, later Duchess of Fife and Princess Royal, (1867–1931)
 Prince Christian Carl Frederik Albert Alexander Vilhelm of Denmark, later King Christian X, (1870–1947)
 Prince Christian Frederik Carl Georg Valdemar Axel of Denmark, later King Haakon VII of Norway, (1872–1957)
 Princess Louise Caroline Josephine Sophie Thyra Olga of Denmark (1875–1906)
 Princess Ingeborg Charlotte Caroline Frederikke of Denmark, later Duchess of Västergötland, (1878–1958)
 Princess Marie Luise Viktoria Karoline Amalie Alexandra Auguste Friederike of Hanover (1879–1948)
 Princess Thyra Louise Caroline Amalie Augusta Elisabeth of Denmark (1880–1945)
 Princess Alexandra Luise Marie Olga Elisabeth Therese Vera of Hanover (1882–1945)
 Prince Andrew of Greece and Denmark (1882–1944)
 Princess Olga Adelheid Luise Marie Alexandrina Agnes of Hanover (1884–1958)
 Prince Christian Friedrich Wilhelm Georg Peter Waldemar of Hanover (1885–1901)
 Prince Aage Christian Alexander Robert of Denmark (1887–1940)
 Prince Axel Christian Georg of Denmark (1888–1964)
 Prince Viggo Christian Adolf Georg of Denmark (1893–1970)
 Prince Edward Albert Christian George Andrew Patrick David of York, later King Edward VIII of the United Kingdom, (1894–1972)
 Princess Marie Louise of Schaumburg-Lippe (1897–1938)

King Frederik VIII 
 Prince George Frederick Ernest Albert of Wales, later King George V of the United Kingdom, (1865–1936)
 Prince Andrew of Greece and Denmark (1882–1944)
 Prince Albert Frederick Arthur George of York, later King George VI of the United Kingdom, (1895–1952)
 Prince (Christian) Frederik Franz Michael Carl Valdemar Georg of Denmark, later King Frederik IX, (1899–1972)

Louise of Sweden
 Princess Maud Charlotte Mary Victoria of the United Kingdom, later Queen of Norway, (1869–1938)
 Prince Andrew of Greece and Denmark (1882–1944)
 Prince Oscar Fredrik Wilhelm Olaf Gustaf Adolf of Sweden and Norway, later King Gustaf VI Adolf of Sweden, (1882–1973)
 Princess Marie Louise of Schaumburg-Lippe (1897–1938)

Princess Ingeborg
 Princess Ragnhild Alexandra of Norway (born 1930)
 Princess Astrid Maud Ingeborg of Norway (born 1932)
 Prince Harald of Norway (born 1937), later King Harald V
 Princess Birgitta Ingeborg Alice of Sweden (born 1937)
 Princess Benedikte Astrid Ingeborg Ingrid of Denmark (born 1944)
 Haakon Lorentzen (born 1954)

Prince Valdemar
 Princess Ingeborg Charlotte Caroline Frederikke of Denmark, later Duchess of Västergötland, (1878–1958)
 Prince Christian Friedrich Wilhelm Georg Peter Waldemar of Hanover (1885–1901)

King Christian X
 Prince Viggo Christian Adolf Georg of Denmark (1893–1970)
 Princess Margrethe Alexandrine Þórhildur Ingrid of Denmark, later Queen Margrethe II, (born 1940)
 Princess Benedikte Astrid Ingeborg Ingrid of Denmark (born 1944)
 Princess Anne-Marie Dagmar Ingrid of Denmark, later Queen of Greece, (born 1946)

Alexandrine of Mecklenburg-Schwerin
 Princess Alexandrine Irene "Adini" of Prussia (1915–1980)
 Princess Benedikte Astrid Ingeborg Ingrid of Denmark (born 1944)
 Princess Anne-Marie Dagmar Ingrid of Denmark, later Queen of Greece, (born 1946)

Prince George Valdemar
 Cathrine Ferner (born 1962)
 Prince Frederik André Henrik Christian of Denmark, later Crown Prince Frederik, (born 1968)

King Frederik IX
 Prince Carl Gustaf Folke Hubertus of Sweden, later King Carl XVI Gustaf, (born 1946)

Ingrid of Sweden
 Princess Margaret Rose of York, later Princess of the United Kingdom and Countess of Snowdon, (1930–2002)
 Prince Harald of Norway, later King Harald V, (born 1937)
 Prince Carl Gustaf Folke Hubertus of Sweden, later King Carl XVI Gustaf, (born 1946)

Queen Margrethe II
 Christian Ahlefeldt-Laurvig (born 1955)
 Ellen Hillingsø (born 1967)
 Prince Willem-Alexander Claus George Ferdinand of the Netherlands, later King Willem-Alexander (1967)
 Princess Alexandra Rosemarie Ingrid Benedikte of Sayn-Wittgenstein-Berleburg (born 1970)
 Prince Haakon Magnus of Norway, later Crown Prince Haakon (born 1973)
 Adam Christoffer Knuth (born 1973)
 Gregers Adam Heering (born 1974)
 Johan Henrik Marcus Knuth (born 1976)
 Prince Carl Philip Edmund Bertil of Sweden (born 1979)
 Princess Theodora of Greece and Denmark (born 1983)

Henrik, Prince Consort
 Fleur Just

Crown Prince Frederik
 Count Gregers Carl Preben Ahlefeldt-Laurvig-Bille (born 1995)
 Prince Constantine-Alexios of Greece and Denmark (born 1998)
 Prince Nikolai William Alexander Frederik of Denmark (born 1999)
 Countess Ingrid Alexandra Irma Astrid Benedikte von Pfeil und Klein-Ellguth (born 2003)
 Princess Ingrid Alexandra of Norway (born 2004)
 Rosemarie Heering (born 2005)
 India Handwerk (born 2005)
 Countess Ingeborg Wilhelmine Alexandrine Wedell-Wedellsborg (born 2015)
 Prince Oscar Carl Olof of Sweden, Duke of Skåne (born 2016)

Crown Princess Mary
 Baron Holger Valdemar Carl Gustav Reedtz-Thott (born 2006)
 Josephine Margaretha Victoria Fleming (born 2006)
 Prince Henrik Carl Joachim Alain of Denmark (born 2009)
 Konstantin Gustav Heinrich Richard Johannsmann (born 2010)
 Princess Estelle Silvia Ewa Mary of Sweden, Duchess of Östergötland (born 2012)

Prince Joachim
 Prince Christian Valdemar Henri John of Denmark (born 2005)
 Alexander Davidsen Siesbye (born 2006)
 Count Julius Søeborg Ahlefeldt-Laurvig-Bille (born 2007)

Princess Marie
 Tanguy Peretti (born 2000)
 Agathe Steenstrup (born 2009)
 Sofie Agnete Davidsen Siesbye (born 2009)
 Princess Josephine Sophia Ivalo Mathilda of Denmark (born 2011)
 Nicholas Christian Iuel Bendtner (born 2011)

Princess Benedikte
 Prince Joachim Holger Waldemar Christian of Denmark (born 1969)
 Princess Madeleine Thérèse Amelie Josephine of Sweden (born 1982)
 Prince Philippos of Greece and Denmark (born 1986)

Gustav, 7th Prince of Sayn-Wittgenstein-Berleburg
 Count Friedrich Richard Oscar Jefferson von Pfeil und Klein-Ellguth (born 1999)
 Konstantin Gustav Heinrich Richard Johannsmann (born 2010)
 Prince Vincent Frederik Minik Alexander of Denmark (born 2011)

Carina, Princess of Sayn-Wittgenstein-Berleburg
 Princess Athena Marguerite Françoise Marie of Denmark (born 2012)

Princess Alexandra of Sayn-Wittgenstein-Berleburg
 Maud Angelica Behn (born 2003)
 Prince Odysseas-Kimon of Greece and Denmark (born 2004)
 Amelia Morales y de Grecia (born 2007)

Princess Nathalie of Sayn-Wittgenstein-Berleburg
 Countess Ingrid Alexandra Irma Astrid Benedikte von Pfeil und Klein-Ellguth (born 2003)

Queen Anne-Marie of Greece
 Prince Frederik André Henrik Christian of Denmark, later Crown Prince Frederik (born 1968)
 Prince Gustav Frederik Philip Richard of Sayn-Wittgenstein-Berleburg, later the 7th Prince of Sayn-Wittgenstein-Berleburg, (born 1969)

Princess Elisabeth
 Theodor Christian Emanuel Rosanes af Rosenborg (born 2008)

References

Danish monarchy
House of Glücksburg (Denmark)